"What Is It" is a song recorded by American recording artists Baby Bash featuring Sean Kingston for Baby Bash's third album, Cyclone (2007). It was released on January 4, 2008, by Arista Records as the second single. It was written by Baby Bash, J.R. Rotem, Marty James and produced by J.R. Rotem and it contains a sample of "9MM Goes Bang" performed by KRS-One.

Track listing
US CD Promo
"What Is It" (Album Version) – 3:21
"What Is It" (Call Out Hook) – 0:10

Charts

References

2007 songs
2008 singles
Baby Bash songs
Sean Kingston songs
Arista Records singles
Music videos directed by Director X
Song recordings produced by J. R. Rotem
Songs written by J. R. Rotem
Songs written by Marty James
Songs written by KRS-One
Songs written by Baby Bash